Joe Sutton is an American playwright. He teaches playwrighting at Dartmouth College. He is the son of actor Frank Sutton.

His play Voir Dire opened in 1995 at the Seattle Repertory Theatre. The play received attention after the O. J. Simpson murder case and the sequestered jury deliberating a case with strong racial overtones and divisive social implications. His play Complicit, was directed by Kevin Spacey and premiered at The Old Vic in London on January 3, 2009.

Publication
Restoring The Sun
The Third Army

References

Living people
American dramatists and playwrights
Year of birth missing (living people)